is a Japanese hat and headpiece designer (milliner).

Life and career 
After graduating from Bunka Fashion College, Nobuki Hizume moved to Italy and announced a brand as an underwear designer. After returning to Japan, he began his own brand NOBUKI HIZUME for Hat & Headpiece and presented his own collections. At the same time, he participated in many big projects in the world.

Since 2009, he moved to Paris and has designed for many famous brands. In 2019, he received the title of Meilleur Ouvrier de France. 

Hizume started his own hat brand "HIZUME" in June 2019.

References

External links 

Résultats du 26e concours "Un des Meilleurs Ouvriers de France"-COMITÉ D’ORGANISATION DES EXPOSITIONS DU TRAVAIL ET DU CONCOURS “ UN DES MEILLEURS OUVRIERS DE FRANCE ”  ( COET-MOF )
Nobuki Hizume - official website
 Isetan's Newly Unveiled Window Display Features Racked's Tokyo Correspondent Misha Janette

1979 births
Living people
Milliners
Japanese fashion designers